The Lockheed P-80 Shooting Star was the first jet fighter used operationally by the United States Army Air Forces (USAAF) during World War II. Designed and built by Lockheed in 1943 and delivered just 143 days from the start of design, production models were flying, and two pre-production models did see very limited service in Italy just before the end of World War II. Designed with straight wings, the type saw extensive combat in Korea with the United States Air Force (USAF) as the F-80.

America's first successful turbojet-powered combat aircraft, it was soon outclassed with the appearance of the swept-wing transonic MiG-15 and was quickly replaced in the air superiority role by the transonic F-86 Sabre. The F-94 Starfire, an all-weather interceptor using the same airframe, also saw Korean War service. The closely related T-33 Shooting Star trainer remained in service with the U.S. Air Force and Navy well into the 1980s, with the last NT-33 variant not retired until April 1997.

Design and development
The XP-80 had a conventional all-metal airframe, with a slim low wing and tricycle landing gear. Like most early jets designed during World War II—and before the Allies captured German research data that confirmed the speed advantages of swept-wings—the XP-80 had straight wings, similar to previous propeller-driven fighters. It was the first operational jet fighter to have its engine in the fuselage, a format previously used in the pioneering German Heinkel He 178 V1 of 1939, and the later British Gloster E.28/39 demonstrator of 1941. Other early jets generally had two engines because of their limited power, these being mounted in external nacelles for easier maintenance. With the advent of more powerful British jet engines, fuselage mounting was more effective, and it was used by nearly all subsequent fighter aircraft.

Lockheed was the first American aircraft company to start work on a jet powered aircraft, beginning work on the L-133 in 1939. The L-133 eventually developed into an extremely advanced design, including futuristic features such as canard forewings and a blended wing body, but when Lockheed presented the design to the USAAF, it was rejected as being technologically unfeasible. Instead the USAAF concentrated development around the much less radical Bell P-59 Airacomet, which first flew in October 1942. It quickly became obvious, however, that the P-59's performance was only marginally superior to current piston engined fighters. Bell performed preliminary work on a revised version of P-59 featuring a single engine mounted within the fuselage and a low mounted wing designated the XP-59B, but by this time the Bell factory was swamped with other work so the USAAF transferred work on this project to Lockheed.

The impetus for development of the P-80 was the discovery by Allied intelligence of the Me 262 in spring 1943, which had made only test flights of its own first quartet (the V1 through V4 airframes) of design prototypes at that time, all fitted with retracting tailwheel landing gear. After receiving documents and blueprints comprising years of British jet aircraft research, the commanding General of the Army Air Forces, Henry H. Arnold, believed an airframe developed to accept the British-made Halford H-1 B "Goblin" jet engine could provide the superior performance to match the new German jets, and the Materiel Command's Wright Field research and development division tasked Lockheed to design the aircraft based on their experience with the L-133. Concept work began on the XP-80 in May 1943. Since the British turbojet was not yet delivered, Lockheed obtained its blueprint dimensions from Bell as ordered by the USAAC. Lockheed's team, consisting of 28 engineers, was led by Clarence L. "Kelly" Johnson in the same manner as the P-38 Lightning, in the same remote building with high security and greater autonomy, a continuation of Lockheed's Skunk Works style of research and development.

With the Germans and British clearly far ahead in development, Lockheed was pressed to develop a comparable jet as quickly as possible. Kelly Johnson submitted a design proposal in mid-June and promised that the prototype would be ready for testing in 150 days. The Skunk Works team, beginning 26 June 1943, produced the airframe in 143 days, delivering it to Muroc Army Airfield on 16 November.

The project was so secret that only five of the more than 130 people working on it knew that they were developing a jet aircraft, and the British engineer who delivered the Goblin engine was detained by the police because Lockheed officials could not vouch for him. After the engine had been mated to the airframe, foreign object damage during the first run-up destroyed the engine. The British engineer who had delivered the engine had warned Lockheed that the skin of the inlet ducts was too thin but the American engineers ignored this warning and both ducts collapsed and were sucked into the engine when at full throttle. This delayed the first flight until a second engine (the only other existing) could be delivered from Britain, de Havilland generously donating the engine intended for the prototype Vampire.

The first prototype (44-83020) was nicknamed Lulu-Belle (also known as "the Green Hornet" because of its paint scheme). Powered by the replacement Halford H1 taken from the prototype de Havilland Vampire jet fighter, it first flew on 8 January 1944, with Lockheed test pilot Milo Burcham at the controls. Following this flight, Johnson said, "It was a magnificent demonstration, our plane was a success – such a complete success that it had overcome the temporary advantage the Germans had gained from years of preliminary development on jet planes." The donated British jet engine and program data had no doubt proved invaluable. Contemporary pilots, when transitioning to pioneering jets like the Shooting Star, were unused to flying at high speed without a loud reciprocating engine and had to learn to rely on the airspeed indicator.

The second prototype, designated XP-80A, was designed for the larger General Electric I-40 engine (an improved J31, later produced by Allison as the J33). Two aircraft (44-83021 and 44-83022) were built. 44-83021 was nicknamed the Gray Ghost after its "pearl gray" paint scheme, while 83022, left unpainted for comparison of flight characteristics, became known as the Silver Ghost. The XP-80A's first test flight was unimpressive, but most of the problems with the design were soon addressed and corrected in the test program. Initial opinions of the XP-80A were not positive, with Lockheed Chief Engineering Test Pilot Milo Burcham commenting that an aircraft he very much enjoyed (powered by the Halford engine) had now become a "dog." The XP-80As were primarily testbeds for larger, more powerful engines and air intake design, and consequently were larger and 25% heavier than the XP-80.

The P-80 testing program proved very dangerous. Burcham was killed on 20 October 1944 while flying the third YP-80A, 44–83025. The Gray Ghost was lost on a test flight on 20 March 1945, although pilot Tony LeVier escaped. Newly promoted to chief engineering test pilot to replace Burcham, LeVier bailed out when one of the engine's turbine blades broke, causing structural failure in the aircraft's tail. LeVier landed hard and broke his back, but returned to the test program after six months of recovery.

The top-scoring World War II USAAF ace Major Richard Bong was also killed on an acceptance flight of a production P-80 in the United States on 6 August 1945. Both Burcham and Bong crashed as a result of main fuel pump failure. Burcham's death was the result of a failure to brief him on a newly installed emergency fuel pump backup system, but the investigation of Bong's crash found that he had apparently forgotten to switch on this pump, which could have prevented the accident. He bailed out when the aircraft rolled inverted but was too close to the ground for his parachute to deploy.

After Bong's death, both the USAAF and Lockheed wanted to prove the reliability of the airplane. Robert E. Thacker from the Flight Test Division at Wright Field was ordered to select three other pilots, pick up 5 P-80s from Lockheed and fly them to Muroc Army Airbase, and fly each airplane there for 500 hours. Thacker tapped Chuck Yeager, plus two other pilots and they put 500 hours on each airplane without further incident.

The Me 262 apparently has a higher critical Mach number (the Me 262A's being at M 0.86), from a drag standpoint, than any current Army Air Force fighter."

Costs
Costs in approximately 1947 United States dollars and have not been adjusted for inflation.

This is roughly $1,238,644 in 2018 dollars

Operational history

The Shooting Star began to enter service in late 1944 with 12 pre-production YP-80As, one of which was destroyed in the accident in which Burcham was killed. A 13th YP-80A was modified to the sole F-14 photo reconnaissance model and lost in a December crash.

Four were sent to Europe for operational testing (demonstration, familiarization, and possible interception roles), two to England and two to the 1st Fighter Group at Lesina Airfield, Italy, but when test pilot Major Frederic Borsodi was killed in a crash caused by an engine fire while demonstrating a YP-80A (44-83026) at RAF Burtonwood, Lancashire, England,  on 28 January 1945, the YP-80A was temporarily grounded.

Before World War II ended, however, two American pre-production Lockheed YP-80A Shooting Star fighter jets saw limited service in Italy with the USAAF on reconnaissance, in February and March 1945. Because of delays in delivery of production aircraft, the Shooting Star saw no actual combat during the conflict.

The initial production order was for 344 P-80As after USAAF acceptance in February 1945.  A total of 83 P-80s had been delivered by the end of July 1945 and 45 assigned to the 412th Fighter Group (later redesignated the 1st Fighter Group) at Muroc Army Air Field. Production continued after the war, although wartime plans for 5,000 were quickly reduced to 2,000 at a little under $100,000 a copy. A total of 1,714 single-seat F-80A, F-80B, F-80C, and RF-80s were manufactured by the end of production in 1950, of which 927 were F-80Cs (including 129 operational F-80As upgraded to F-80C-11-LO standards). However, the two-seat TF-80C, first flown on 22 March 1948, became the basis for the T-33 trainer, of which 6,557 were produced.

On 27 January 1946, Colonel William H. Councill flew a P-80 nonstop across the U.S. to make the first transcontinental jet flight. The P-80B prototype, modified as a racer and designated P-80R, was piloted by Colonel Albert Boyd to a world air speed record of 623.73 mph (1,004.2 km/h) on 19 June 1947.

The P-80C began production in 1948; on 11 June, now part of the USAF, the P-80C was officially redesignated the F-80C. The USAF Strategic Air Command had F-80 Shooting Stars in service from 1946 through 1948 with the 1st and 56th Fighter Groups. The first P-80s to serve in Europe joined the 55th Fighter Group (later redesignated the 31st FG) at Giebelstadt, Germany, in 1946, remaining 18 months. When the Soviet Union blockaded Berlin, a squadron of the 56th FG led by Colonel David C. Schilling made the first west-to-east Atlantic crossing by single-engined jets in July, flying to Germany for 45 days in Operation Fox Able I. Replaced by the newly F-80-equipped 36th Fighter Group at Fürstenfeldbruck, the 56th FG conducted Fox Able II in May 1949. That same year F-80s first equipped the 51st Fighter Group, based in Japan.

The 4th (Langley Air Force Base, Virginia), 81st (Kirtland Air Force Base, New Mexico), and 57th (Elmendorf Air Force Base, Alaska) Fighter Groups all acquired F-80s in 1948, as did interceptor squadrons of the Air Defense Command. The first Air National Guard unit to fly the F-80C was the 196th FS of the California ANG in June 1947.

U.S. Navy service

Several P-80A Shooting Stars were transferred to the United States Navy beginning 29 June 1945, retaining their P-80 designations. At Naval Air Station Patuxent River, one Navy P-80 was modified with required add-ons, such as an arrestor hook, and loaded aboard the aircraft carrier  at Norfolk, Virginia, on 31 October 1946. The following day the aircraft made four deck-run takeoffs and two catapult launches, with five arrested landings, flown by Marine Major Marion Carl. A second series of trials was held on 11 November.

The U.S. Navy had already begun procuring its own jet aircraft, but the slow pace of delivery was causing retention problems among pilots, particularly those of the Marines who were still flying Vought F4U Corsairs. To increase land-based jet-transition training in the late 1940s, 50 F-80Cs were transferred to the U.S. Navy from the U.S. Air Force in 1949 as jet trainers. Designated TO-1 by the Navy (changed to TV-1 in 1950), 25 were based at Naval Air Station North Island, California, with VF-52, and 16 assigned to the Marine Corps, equipping VMF-311 at Marine Corps Air Station El Toro. These aircraft were eventually sent to reserve units. The success of these aircraft led to the procurement by the Navy of 698 T-33 Shooting Stars (as the TO-2/TV-2) to provide a two-seat aircraft for the training role. Lockheed went on to develop a carrier-capable version, the T2V SeaStar, which went into service in 1957.

Korean War

Shooting Stars first saw combat service in the Korean War, and were among the first aircraft to be involved in jet-versus-jet combat.

The Americans used the F-80C variant and RF-80 photo-recon variants in Korea. The F-80 flew both air-to-air and air-to-ground sorties, claiming several aerial victories against North Korean Yak-9s and Il-10s.

On 1 November 1950, a Russian MiG-15 pilot, Lieutenant Semyon F. Khominich, became the first pilot in history to be credited with a jet-versus-jet aerial kill after he claimed to have shot down an F-80. According to the Americans, the F-80 was downed by flak. One week later, on 8 November, the first American claim for a jet-versus-jet aerial kill was made when Lieutenant Russell J. Brown, flying an F-80, reported that he shot down a MiG-15. Soviet records claim that no MiGs were lost that day and that their pilot, Senior Lieutenant Kharitonov, survived by pulling out of a dive at low altitude.

Despite initial claims of success, the speed of the straight-wing F-80s was inferior to the 668 mph (1075 km/h) MiGs. The MiGs incorporated German research that showed that swept wings delayed the onset of compressibility problems, and enabled speeds much closer to the speed of sound. F-80s were soon replaced in the air superiority role by the North American F-86 Sabre, which had been delayed to also incorporate swept wings into an improved straight-winged naval FJ-1 Fury. However, F-80 pilots still destroyed a total of six MiG-15s in aerial combat. When sufficient Sabres were in operation, the Shooting Star flew exclusively ground-attack missions, and were also used for advanced flight training duties and air defense in Japan. By the end of hostilities, the only F-80s still flying in Korea were photo-reconnaissance variants.

F-80Cs equipped 10 USAF squadrons in Korea:
 8th Fighter-Bomber Wing (35th, 36th, and 80th Fighter-Bomber Squadrons), based at Suwon Air Base, was the longest-serving F-80 unit in Korea. It began missions from Japan in June 1950 and continued to fly the Shooting Star until May 1953, when it converted to F-86 Sabres.
 49th Fighter-Bomber Group (7th, 8th, and 9th FBS) deployed to Taegu AB (K-2), Korea, from Japan in September 1950 and continued fighter-bomber missions in the F-80C until June 1951, when it converted to the F-84 Thunderjet.
 51st Fighter-Interceptor Wing (16th and 25th FIS) operated F-80Cs from Kimpo AB (K-14) and Japan from September 1950 to November 1951 when it transitioned to F-86s.
 35th Fighter-Interceptor Group and two squadrons, the 39th and 40th FIS, went to Pohang, Korea in July 1950, but converted to the P-51 Mustang before the end of the year.

One RF-80A unit operated in the Korean War:
 8th Tactical Reconnaissance Squadron, later redesignated 15th TRS, served from 27 June 1950 at Itazuke, Japan, Taegu (K-2), and Kimpo (K-14), South Korea, until after the armistice. The squadron also utilized a few converted RF-80Cs and RF-86s.

During the Korean war, 368 F-80s were lost, including 277 in combat missions and 91 non-combat losses Of the 277 F-80s lost in operations (approximately 30% of the existing inventory), 113 were lost to ground fire, 14 to enemy aircraft, 54 to "unknown causes" and 96 were "other losses". F-80s are credited by the USAF with destroying 17 aircraft in air-to-air combat and 24 on the ground. Major Charles J. Loring Jr. was posthumously awarded the Medal of Honor for his actions while flying an F-80 with the 80th Fighter-Bomber Squadron, 8th Fighter-Bomber Wing on 22 November 1952.

Variants

P-80/F-80
1714 production aircraft were delivered to the Air Force prior to any conversions or redesignations, with their original block numbers.

XP-80
Prototype powered by a de Havilland-built Halford H.1B turbojet and first flown 8 January 1944, one built.
XP-80A
Production prototype variant powered by a General Electric I-40 turbojet, increased span and length but wing area reduced, two built.
YP-80A 12 pre-production aircraft. One aircraft, 44-83027, lent to Rolls-Royce Limited and used for development of the Nene engine.
XF-14 One built from YP-80A order (44-83024), lost in midair collision with B-25 Mitchell chase plane on 6 December 1944; USAAF photo reconnaissance prototype.
P-80A 344 block 1-LO aircraft; 180 block 5-LO aircraft. Block 5 and all subsequent Shooting Stars were natural metal finish. Fitted with  tiptanks.
F-80A USAF designation of P-80A.
EF-80 Modified to test "Prone Pilot" cockpit positions.

F-14A Unknown number of photo-reconnaissance conversions from P-80A, all redesignated FP-80A.
XFP-80A Modified P-80A 44–85201 with hinged nose for camera equipment.

FP-80A 152 block 15-LO; operational photo reconnaissance aircraft.
RF-80A USAF designation of FP-80A, 66 operational F-80A's modified to RF-80A standard.
ERF-80A Modified P-80A 44–85042 with experimental nose contour.
XP-80B Reconfigured P-80A, improved J-33 engine, one built as prototype for P-80B
P-80B 209 block 1-LO; 31 block 5-LO; first model fitted with an ejection seat (retrofitted into -As); delivered between March 1947 and March 1948 
F-80B USAF designation of P-80B.
P-80R Modification of XP-80B to racer.
P-80C 162 block 1-LO; 75 block 5-LO; 561 block 10-LO
F-80C USAF designation of P-80C; 128 F-80A modified to F-80C-11-LO with J-33-A-35 engine and ejection seat installed; fitted with  tiptanks; major P-80 production version.
RF-80C 70 modified F-80A and F-80C, and six modified RF-80A, to RF-80C and RF-80C-11, respectively; upgraded photo recon plane.
DF-80A Designation given to number of F-80As converted into drone directors.
QF-80A/QF-80C/QF-80F Project Bad Boy F-80 conversions by Sperry Gyroscope to target drones. Q-8 was initially proposed as designation for the QF-80.
TP-80C First designation for TF-80C trainer prototype.
TF-80C Prototype for T-33 (48-0356).
TO-1/TV-1 U.S. Navy variant of F-80C; 49 block 1-LO and one block 5-LO aircraft transferred to USN in 1949; 16 initially went to U.S. Marine Corps.

Derivatives
Lockheed T-33 Shooting Star
Lockheed also produced a two-seat trainer variant with a longer fuselage, the T-33, which remained in production until 1959 and was produced under license in Japan and Canada. The trainer was used by more than 20 countries. A total of 6,557 T-33s were built and some are still flying.

Lockheed F-94 Starfire
Two TF-80Cs were modified as prototypes for the F-94 Starfire, an all-weather fighter produced in three variants.

Former Operators

 33 F-80Cs delivered starting in 1958, withdrawn from service in 1973.
 around 30 F-80Cs delivered from 1958 on, last ones retired from service in 1974.
 16 F-80Cs delivered starting in 1958, retired by 1966.
 16 F-80Cs delivered between 1957 and 1960, six returned to the United States in 1965.
 16 F-80Cs delivered starting in 1958, used by the 13th Fighter-Bomber Group until the type was phased out in 1973.

 United States Air Force
 United States Navy, 1945 to 1970s
 at least 18 F-80Cs delivered in 1958, withdrawn from use in 1972.

Aircraft on display

Brazil
F-80C
49-0433 – Museu Aeroespacial in Rio de Janeiro, Brazil.

Chile
49-0787 – Museo Nacional Aeronáutico y del Espacio, Los Cerrillos Airport, Santiago, Chile.

United States

XP-80
44-83020 (Lulu-Belle) – National Air and Space Museum in Washington, D.C.. First flown on 8 January 1944, it was restored right after the 1976 opening of the National Air and Space Museum and is still in their collection.
P-80A

44-84999 – Hill Aerospace Museum at Hill AFB, Utah. This airframe is a T-33A that has been modified and painted to resemble a P-80.
44-85123 – Air Force Flight Test Museum at Edwards Air Force Base in California. Currently undergoing restoration. This aircraft set transcontinental speed record in January 1946, closed circuit speed record in June 1946, and won the Thompson Trophy Race in September 1946. Was then used to test nose fairing and wing designs.
44-85125 (displayed as 44-85152) – Kalamazoo Air Zoo in Kalamazoo, Michigan.
44-85391 (front of fuselage) – Air Victory Museum, Medford, New Jersey.
44-85488 – Planes of Fame in Chino, California.
P-80B
45-8357 – Museum of Aviation at Robins Air Force Base, Warner Robins, Georgia.
45-8490 – Castle Air Museum at the former Castle Air Force Base in Atwater, California.
45-8501 – Kirtland AFB, Albuquerque, New Mexico.
45-8517 – Anna Jordan Park, Baton Rouge, Louisiana.
45-8612 – Pima Air & Space Museum adjacent to Davis-Monthan AFB in Tucson, Arizona.
45-8704 – Aerospace Museum of California at the former McClellan AFB in Sacramento, California.
P-80C
47-0171 – Iowa Gold Star Military Museum, Camp Dodge, Des Moines, Iowa.
47-0215 – Reflections of Freedom Air Park, McConnell AFB, Wichita, Kansas.
47-1837 – Redesignated USMC TO-1 BuNo 33840 at the Flying Leatherneck Aviation Museum at MCAS Miramar, San Diego, California.
47-1392 – Naval Air Station Joint Reserve Base Fort Worth, Fort Worth, Texas.
48-0868 – EAA Airventure Museum in Oshkosh, Wisconsin.
49-0432 (displayed as 49-417) – Air Force Armament Museum at Eglin AFB, Florida.
49-0696 – National Museum of the United States Air Force at Wright-Patterson AFB in Dayton, Ohio.
49-0710 – Mid-America Air Museum, Liberal, Kansas.
49-0719 – in storage awaiting restoration at Yanks Air Museum in Chino, California.
49-1853 – Veteran's Memorial Square, Holloman AFB in New Mexico.
49-1872 – Pueblo Weisbrod Aircraft Museum, Pueblo Memorial Airport, Pueblo, Colorado.
P-80R
44-85200 – National Museum of the United States Air Force at Wright-Patterson AFB in Dayton, Ohio. This aircraft was specially modified for racing by equipping it with a smaller canopy, a shorter wing, and redesigned air intakes. On 19 June 1947, it was flown by Colonel Albert Boyd to a new world speed record of 623.73 mph (1,004.2 km/h), equaling Heini Dittmar's 623 mph (1,004 km/h) unofficial record velocity in one of the Me 163A liquid-fueled rocket fighter prototypes, set on 2 October 1941 after being towed to the height for the attempt by a Bf 110. The P-80R aircraft was shipped to the Museum from Griffiss Air Force Base in New York in October 1954. The next American jet speed record was set two months later, on 20 August by Commander Turner Caldwell, USN, reaching 640.744 miles per hour (1,031.178 km/h) while flying the turbojet-powered Douglas Skystreak D-558-1 No. 1.
F-80
0-36100 – Chamberlain, South Dakota on public display.
18513 - Memorial Park in New Kensington, PA.  Also has TR-513 in front of the left air intake under U.S. Air Force.

Uruguay
F-80C
47-0205 (FAU213) – Museo de la aeronautica in Montevideo, Uruguay.

Specifications (P-80C/F-80C)

See also

References

Notes

Citations

Bibliography
 Andrade, John. Latin-American Military Aviation. Leicester, UK: Midland Counties Publications, 1982. .
 Arnold, Rhodes. Shooting Star, T-Bird & Starfire: A Famous Lockheed Family. Tucson, Arizona: Aztex Corp., 1981. .
 Baugher, Joe. "Lockheed P-80/F-80 Shooting Star." USAAC/USAAF/USAF Fighter and Pursuit Aircraft, 16 July 1999.

 Bilstein, Roger E. Flight in America: From the Wrights to the Astronauts. Baltimore, Maryland: Hopkins Fulfillment Service, Johns Hopkins University Press, 2001. .
 Davis, Larry. MiG Alley: Air to Air Combat Over Korea. Carrollton, Texas: Squadron/Signal Publications, 1978. .
 Davis, Larry. P-80 Shooting Star. T-33/F-94 in action. Carrollton, Texas: Squadron/Signal Publications, 1980. .
 Dorr, Robert F. "P-80 Shooting Star Variants". Wings of Fame Vol. 11. London: Aerospace Publishing, 1998. .
 Fitzsimons, Bernard, ed. "Shooting Star, Lockheed F-80/T-33." Illustrated Encyclopedia of 20th Century Weapons and Warfare, Volume 21. London: Phoebus, 1978. .
 Francillon, René J. Lockheed aircraft since 1913 London: Putnam & Company, 1982. 

 Green, William. War Planes of the Second World War, Volume Four: Fighters. London: MacDonald & Co., 1961 (Sixth impression 1969). .
 Green, William and Gordon Swanborough. The Great Book of Fighters. St. Paul, Minnesota: MBI Publishing, 2001. .
 Green, William and Gordon Swanborough. WW2 Aircraft Fact Files: US Army Air Force Fighters, Part 2. London: Macdonald and Jane's Publishers, 1978. .
 Gunston, Bill. World Encyclopedia of Aero Engines. Cambridge, UK: Patrick Stephens, 1989. .
 Gunston, Bill. Encyclopedia of the World's Combat Aircraft. Feltham, UK: Salamander, 1976. .
 Jenkins, Dennis R. and Tony R. Landis. Experimental & Prototype U.S. Air Force Jet Fighters. North Branch, Minnesota: Specialty Press, 2008. .
 Jones, Lloyd S. US Fighters, Army-Air Force: 1925 to 1980s. Los Angeles: Aero Publishers, 1975. .
 Knaack, Marcelle Size. Encyclopedia of US Air Force Aircraft and Missile Systems: Volume 1 Post-World War II Fighters 1945–1973. Washington, D.C.: Office of Air Force History, 1978. .
 Pace, Steve. Lockheed Skunk Works. St. Paul, Minnesota: Motorbooks International, 1992. .
 Polmar, Norman. "Lots of Shooting Stars". Naval History (United States Naval Institute), Vol. 14, No. 4, August 2001, pp. 12–14.
 Roux, Élodie. Turbofan and Turbojet Engines: Database Handbook. Raleigh, North Carolina: Éditions Élodie Roux, 2007. .
 United States Air Force Museum Guidebook. Wright-Patterson AFB, OH: Air Force Museum Foundation, 1975.
 Wooldridge, E.T. Jr. The P-80 Shooting Star: Evolution of a Jet Fighter (Famous Aircraft of the National Air and Space Museum Series, Vol. 3). Washington, D.C.: Smithsonian Institution Press, 1979. .

External links

 Aircraft of the Smithsonian: Lockheed XP-80 Lulu-Belle 
 Lockheed P-80 Shooting Star
 Lockheed P-80 Shooting Star

P-080
1940s United States fighter aircraft
Single-engined jet aircraft
Low-wing aircraft
World War II jet aircraft of the United States
Aircraft first flown in 1944